Eduardo Sáenz Hermúa (1859–1898), artistically known as Mecachis, was a Spanish cartoonist, illustrator, and playwright. He also signed works as Augusto Marnaz.

Biography 
He worked in publications such as La Broma, Madrid Cómico, La Caricatura (which he founded in 1884 together with José Gil y Campos), La Correspondencia de España, and Blanco y Negro.

Regarding his playwright credits, he authored, among others, Sol, Tila, Figaro, Mademoiselle, Pajarón, El Barbero de mi barrio, and Los Chicos.

He died on 29 July 1898.

References 

Spanish cartoonists
1859 births
1898 deaths
19th-century Spanish dramatists and playwrights